Dashdibi (also Romanized as Dāshdībī; also known as Dāshdebī) is a village in Ani Rural District, in the Central District of Germi County, Ardabil Province, Iran. At the 2006 census, its population was 92, in 16 families.

References 

Towns and villages in Germi County